Sun Storm (Solstorm), published in the UK as The Savage Altar, is the first novel by Swedish crime-writer Åsa Larsson. The novel is the first in the Rebecka Martinsson series. It won Sweden's Best First Crime Novel award, and, on publication in the UK, was shortlisted for the Duncan Lawrie International Dagger, awarded by the CWA for crime novels in translation. The novel is translated into English by Marlaine Delargy.

Editions 

Sun Storm (New York, Delacorte Press)
Sun Storm (New York, Delta Trade Paperbacks)
The Savage Altar (London, Viking)

Film 
Solstorm was produced in 2007 with Izabella Scorupco as Rebecka Martinsson.

2003 Swedish novels
Swedish crime novels
Novels by Åsa Larsson
Rebecka Martinsson books

fi:Aurinkomyrsky